Satish Laxmanrao Jarkiholi (born 1 June 1962) is an INC politician & mass leader of Belgavi who served as the Minister of Forest, Ecology and Environment, Government of Karnataka from 22 December 2018 to 23 July 2019. He is currently serving as the Member of Karnataka Legislative Assembly representing the Yemakanmardi constituency since 2008. He was the forest and environment minister in the H. D. Kumarswamy cabinet. He is a former minister of Small scale Industries and also was a Minister of Excise in the Siddaramaiah cabinet.

Life
Satish Jarkiholi was born in a prominent sugarcane-growing family in Belagavi district. His brothers Ramesh Jarkiholi and Balachandra Jarkiholi are both politicians and represent Gokak and Arabhavi legislative constituencies respectively.

Belgaum Lok Sabha constituency by-election, 2021
He unsuccessfully contested the 2021 by poll from Belagavi Lok sabha seat, vacated after the demise of incumbent MP Suresh Angadi, former Minister of State for Railways. He was defeated by Mangala Suresh Angadi (wife of Suresh Angadi) with a margin of 5,240 votes. Mangala Suresh Angadi was the first politician to defeat Satish Jarkiholi, in his political life spanning about 30 years.

References

People from Belgaum
Living people
Indian National Congress politicians from Karnataka
1962 births
Karnataka MLAs 2018–2023
Karnataka MLAs 2008–2013
Karnataka MLAs 2013–2018